Claude (Claudius) Honoré Désiré Dornier (born in Kempten im Allgäu on 14 May 1884 – 5 December 1969) was a German-French airplane designer and founder of Dornier GmbH. His notable designs include the 12-engine Dornier Do X flying boat, for decades the world's largest and most powerful airplane. He also made several other successful aircraft.

Biography
The son of a French wine importer and his German wife, Claude Dornier was born in Bavaria where he grew up and attended school, with science being his chief interest. Dornier then moved to Munich, where he graduated in 1907 from the Technical University.

As a young engineer, Dornier first worked on strength calculations at the Nagel Engineering Works in Karlsruhe. In 1910 he joined Luftschiffbau Zeppelin in Friedrichshafen on the Bodensee, where his  abilities quickly attracted Count Ferdinand von Zeppelin's attention. Soon appointed as the Count's personal scientific advisor, Dornier began working on improving the strength of light metal sections, and later on aircraft engineering and giant metal flying boats and was responsible for the development of the first stressed skin all-metal monocoque aircraft designs, including the Zeppelin-Lindau D.I, which was the first such aircraft to enter production.

After political pressure he joined the Nazi Party in 1940 and during the Second World War his company created many aircraft for the German armed forces. After the war during the denazification of Germany, Claude Dornier was classified as a "Follower" (Group IV).

Dornier received the Ludwig-Prandtl-Ring from the Deutsche Gesellschaft für Luft- und Raumfahrt (German Society for Aeronautics and Astronautics) for "outstanding contribution in the field of aerospace engineering" in 1959.

His son, was also an aircraft designer.

In 1987 Dornier was inducted into the International Air & Space Hall of Fame at the San Diego Air & Space Museum.

References

Citations

Bibliography

External links
 

1884 births
1969 deaths
German aerospace engineers
20th-century German inventors
German company founders
20th-century German businesspeople
German aerospace businesspeople
German people of French descent
Technical University of Munich alumni
Ludwig-Prandtl-Ring recipients
Knights Commander of the Order of Merit of the Federal Republic of Germany
Engineers from Bavaria